Karla Wilson (November 16, 1934 – December 31, 2022) was an American politician who served as a member of the Washington House of Representatives from 1985 to 1991. A lifelong resident of Lake Stevens, Washington, she represented Washington legislative district 39A as a Democrat. She studied at Vassar College in New York and earned a Bachelor of Arts in English/Education and a Master of Arts in special education, both from the University of Washington. Wilson later taught at Lake Stevens High School and was a Running Start administrator at Everett Community College.

Wilson had three daughters and raised several foster children with her husband Bill Wilson. She died at the age of 88 at a nursing home in East Wenatchee, Washington, on December 31, 2022.

References

1934 births
2022 deaths
Democratic Party members of the Washington House of Representatives
Women state legislators in Washington (state)